Huicheng  town is the county seat of She County, 
Huangshan City, Anhui, China.

See also
List of township-level divisions of Anhui

References

Towns in Anhui
She County, Anhui